Marie-Thérèse Marguerite Jeanne (Maïté) Duval (Maïté Rijkhart de Voogd-Duval, Renazé, 26 March 1944 – Zutphen, 2 November 2019) was a French-born Dutch sculptress and drafter.

Life and work 
Maïté Duval was born in Renazé (Mayenne, Pays de la Loire, France) and studied literature at the University of Rouen Normandy. In 1968 she moved to the Netherlands where she started her career as a self-taught sculptress in 1974. Her work was presented at many group and solo exhibitions, including those at Museum Henriette Polak (Zutphen, 1978 and 1996), Singer Museum (Laren, North Holland, 1983), Galerie Mia Joosten (Amsterdam, 1998), Beeldentuin Interart (Heeswijk, 1993–1999) and Den Haag Sculptuur (The Hague, 2003).

Duval lived and worked in Zutphen, where she exhibited her works in her atelier and sculpture garden. She was married to the painter Thierry Rijkhart de Voogd (1944–1999), who was likewise of French birth. 

Duval became known as a sculptress of "the female form", although there were important exceptions, like De Gans (The Goose, 1981) and IJsberen (Polar bears, 1986).

Duval died at the age of 75. Her sculpture Ingekeerd (Introverted, 1989) was placed on her grave in Zutphen.

Statues by Duval in the public space 
The dates given for each sculpture are the years of creation and subsequent copies at the original locations. Statues include:
 Bérendine (1976), municipal school in Voorst (1977), De Beukenhof in Loosdrecht (1987)
 Schouders (1976, Shoulders), Centraal Beheer, Apeldoorn
 Torso cambré (1979, Arched torso), De Hanzehof, Zutphen (1996)
 Rêverie (1980), town hall of Voorst in Twello (1982) and De Sokkerwei, Castricum (2003)
 De Gans (1981, The Goose), town hall of Deventer (1982), Voorst (1987) and Kleidijk, Rhoon (2003)
 Else (1982), 't Veld Paasberg, Terborg (1989) and Oude Bornhof, Zutphen (1990)
 Bérendine (1984), Lochem (1987), De Scheg, Deventer
 Bérendine (1985), town hall Zutphen, location Warnsveld
 Zuster van het Gemeene Leven op het bleekveld (1985, Sister of the Common Life on the bleaching field), Agnietenhof, Zutphen. Also a preparatory study in Museum Catharijneconvent, Utrecht
 Monument Stormramp of 1925 (1985, Tornado monument), Kerkplein, Borculo 
 IJsberen (1986, Polar bears), Callunaplein, Dieren
 IJsberen – small version (1986), Verpleeghuis Lückerheide, Kerkrade (1994) and 't Bouwhuis, Enschede (2004)
 Rust na arbeid (1987, Rest after work), Dorpsplein, Klarenbeek
 De Sprong (1987, The jump), Henriette Polaklaan, Zutphen (1996)
 Paula in kamerjas (1988, Paula in Dressing Gown) in the Sculpture Garden of Museum de Fundatie (Heino, Netherlands) and previously in the nursing home De Hoogweide, Lochem (1994), Medisch Spectrum Twente, Enschede (1998) and in Hoog Soeren (2010)
 Melancholie (1991, Melancholia), Museum Henriette Polak, Zutphen. In 2009 relocated to the entrance hall of the Stedelijk Museum Zutphen
 Draaiende vrouw (1991, Spinning woman), ING Bank, Zutphen (1997)
 Ainsi Soit-elle (1992, This is who she is), De Koppellaan, Beek en Donk (1994), Stationsstraat, Apeldoorn (1995) and Belvédère, Breda (2007)
 Geste libre (1996, Free gesture), Frans Halslaan, Zutphen (2006)
 Volupté (2000); Beeldenboulevard Papendrecht (Sculpture Boulevard), Merwehoofd, Papendrecht, the Netherlands, 2011; Deventerweg, Zutphen, 2022.

Gallery of her sculptures in the Netherlands

Public collections 
Work by Maïté Duval can be found in various public art collections in the Netherlands:
 CODA Museum (nl), Apeldoorn
 Mariënheem sculpture garden (nl), Raalte
 Museum de Fundatie, Zwolle
 Museum Catharijneconvent, Utrecht
 Nijenhuis Castle sculpture garden near Heino, a part of Museum de Fundatie
 Stedelijk Museum Zutphen (nl), Zutphen curates the largest collection: eight sculptures and four drawings.

See also 
 List of Dutch sculptors

External links 
 
  A website for a 2009 group exhibition by French artists living in the Netherlands.
  Inventory of the archives of Duval and Rijkhart de Voogd.

Videos
 . By Anthony Westen 2012, duration 5m:05s. Accessed 14 June 2022.
 . By Anthony Westen 2016, duration 6m:25s. Accessed 14 June 2022.
  By Anthony Westen 2021, duration 6m:15s. Accessed 14 June 2022.

References

1944 births
2019 deaths
Dutch sculptors
Dutch draughtsmen
People from Mayenne